The FIFA Women's Futsal World Cup is an international futsal competition contested by the senior women's national teams of the member associations of FIFA, the sport's global governing body. It was announced by FIFA in December 2022, with the first edition taking place in 2024.

FIFA had previously announced plans for a women's futsal competition in 2018 and received criticism from futsal players for their "public neglect" of the sport.

References

International futsal competitions
Futsal, Women's
Recurring sporting events established in 2022